The 2018 Atlantic 10 men's basketball tournament was the postseason men's basketball tournament for the Atlantic 10 Conference's 2017–18 season. It was held March 7 through March 11, 2018 at Capital One Arena in Washington, D.C. Davidson won the tournament by defeating Rhode Island in the championship game. As a result, Davidson received the conference's automatic bid to the NCAA tournament.

Seeds
All 14 A-10 schools participated in the tournament. Teams were seeded by record within the conference, with a tiebreaker system to seed teams with identical conference records. The top 10 teams received a first round bye and the top four teams received a double bye.

Schedule

Source

Bracket
Source:

References

Atlantic 10 men's basketball tournament
2017–18 Atlantic 10 Conference men's basketball season
College basketball tournaments in Washington, D.C.
2018 in sports in Washington, D.C.